Edward Falloon (20 December 1903 – 4 July 1963) was an Irish professional football defender who played for Crusaders, Aberdeen, Clyde and Larne.

Playing career

Club career

Falloon began his career with Belfast club Crusaders in the 1922/23 season. In 1927, he signed for Scottish club Aberdeen as a forward, before converting to a centre-half. In 1937, he was captain of Aberdeen in their first Scottish Cup final against Celtic, which Aberdeen lost 2–1.

In the following season, 1937–38, he signed for Clyde in a £700 deal. In 1939, he won the Scottish Cup as Clyde beat Motherwell in the final 4–0. That was one of his last games for the club and in Scotland, as he soon moved to his hometown club Larne. After one season there, he rejoined Crusaders and played for one more season before retiring in 1941.

International career
Falloon won two caps for Ireland, in 1931 and 1932, both against Scotland.

Honours
 Aberdeen
 Scottish Cup runner up: 1937

 Clyde
 Scottish Cup winner: 1939

References

1903 births
1963 deaths
People from Larne
Association football defenders
Association footballers from Northern Ireland
Pre-1950 IFA international footballers
Crusaders F.C. players
Aberdeen F.C. players
Clyde F.C. players
Larne F.C. players
Scottish Football League players
Sportspeople from County Antrim
NIFL Premiership players